The Estée Lauder Companies Inc. (stylized as ESTĒE LAUDER) is an American multinational cosmetics company, a manufacturer and marketer of makeup, skincare, fragrance and hair care products, based in Midtown Manhattan, New York City. It is the second largest cosmetics company in the world after L'Oréal. The company owns a diverse portfolio of brands, including La Mer, Jo Malone London, Clinique and Tom Ford Beauty, among many more, distributed internationally through both digital commerce and retail channels.

History

The company began in 1946 when Estée Lauder and her husband Joseph began producing cosmetics in New York City. They first carried only four products: Cleansing Oil, Skin Lotion, Super Rich All-purpose Creme, and Creme Pack. Two years later, in 1948 they established their first department store account with Saks Fifth Avenue in Manhattan.

Over the next 15 years, they expanded the range and continued to sell their products in the United States. In 1960, the company started its first international account in the London department store Harrods. The following year it opened an office in Hong Kong.

In 1964, they introduced Aramis, a line of fragrance and grooming products for men named after an exotic Turkish root originally used as an aphrodisiac. In 1967, Estée Lauder herself was named one of ten Outstanding Women in Business in the United States by business and financial editors. This was followed by a Spirit of Achievement Award from Albert Einstein College of Medicine at Yeshiva University in 1968. In that year, the company expanded again, opening Clinique,  a dermatologist-guided (Dr. Norman Orentreich), allergy-tested, fragrance-free cosmetic brand.

Estée Lauder's Clinique brand became the first women's cosmetic company to introduce a second line for men when, in 1976, they began a separate line called "Skin Supplies for Men", which continues to be sold at Clinique counters worldwide. In 1981, the company's products became available in the Soviet Union.

In the 1990s, brand acquisitions and licensing agreements contributed to explosive growth as the company transformed from a family-owned business to a publicly traded, family-controlled organization. The decade opened with the creation of Origins — the first wellness brand in U.S. department stores. The first licensing agreement for fragrances was with fashion designer Tommy Hilfiger in 1993, followed by Kiton, an Italian fashion house (1995), and with American fashion designer Donna Karan (1997).

Brand acquisitions began with an investment in the Toronto-based MAC Cosmetics in 1994, which the company then acquired in 1998. Bobbi Brown Cosmetics, designed by the celebrated makeup artist, was acquired in 1995, as was La Mer – along with the original recipe for its supreme luxury product, Crème de la Mer, containing the nutrient-rich Miracle Broth™. The company ventured into its first hair care and holistic beauty brand with Aveda in 1997. The renowned fragrance house Jo Malone London was acquired in 1999.

On November 16, 1995, The Estée Lauder Companies went public on the New York Stock Exchange at $26.00 a share ($6.50 on a post-split basis).

Acquisitions and licensing continued in the 2000s as The Estée Lauder Companies bought a majority interest in Bumble and bumble, the trendy hair care salon, and completed its acquisition in 2006; an exclusive global licensing agreement was signed with fashion designer Michael Kors (2003). Designer Tom Ford begins a project with the company and later an agreement was signed with him (2005) to develop and distribute fragrances and cosmetics under the Tom Ford Beauty brand.

On July 1, 2010, the company acquired Smashbox Beauty Cosmetics, Inc., a brand created in Smashbox Studios in Culver City, California, by brothers Dean and Davis Factor (as in Max).

On October 28, 2011, Aramis and Designer Fragrances, a division of The Estée Lauder Companies Inc., and Tory Burch LLC announced the signing of a multiyear agreement for the exclusive worldwide license of the Tory Burch fragrance business. This partnership marked Tory Burch's first step into the beauty industry. The first Tory Burch fragrance products were introduced in 2013.

In 2012, the company launched AERIN Beauty, a luxury lifestyle beauty and fragrance brand inspired by the signature style of its founder, Aerin Lauder.

In 2014, the company acquired two insider beauty brands, RODIN olio lusso, a skin care brand renowned for its "Luxury Face Oil," and Le Labo, a fragrance and sensory lifestyle brand. Later that year, the company also made its first investment in India by buying a minority stake in Forest Essentials, a luxury cosmetics company specializing in Ayurvedic products. In 2015, the company acquired Editions de Parfums Frédéric Malle, a fragrance brand, and GLAMGLOW, a Hollywood skin care brand.

In 2016, the company acquired Becca Cosmetics, their first color cosmetic group acquisition since Smashbox in 2010. In November 2016, the company made its largest acquisition to date by acquiring California-based cosmetics company Too Faced for US$1.45 billion.

In 2019, the company acquired Dr. Jart+. Founded in Korea in 2004, Dr. Jart+ pioneered the invention of the BB Cream, setting the standard for multifunctional beauty.

In 2021, the company acquired Canadian-based  Deciem Beauty Group Inc. In 2022, Estée Lauder opened a 300,000 sq ft. distribution center in Galgenen, Switzerland.

In  November 2022, the company announced it was to acquire the designer fashion house Tom Ford in a deal worth $2.8bn, with Ford remaining as creative director until at least 2023.

Response to COVID-19 pandemic
In response to the COVID-19 pandemic the Estée Lauder Companies announced on August 20, 2020, a reduction in their workforce by 1,500 to 2,000 personnel worldwide, or about 3 percent of total employees. Most of the reductions will be support workers and store employees. The company also announce they would be closing approximately 10 to 15 percent of their stores, close in-store beauty counters, and focus more on digital operations.

Marketing
The Estée Lauder company has many brands and Estée Lauder is one of the brands. It has had sometimes high-profile spokesmodels, sometimes referred to simply as 'faces'. Past 'faces' for Estée Lauder include Karen Graham, Bruce Boxleitner, Shaun Casey, Willow Bay, Paulina Porizkova, Elizabeth Hurley, Carolyn Murphy, supermodel Liya Kebede was the first African 'face' of Estee Lauder, Anja Rubik, and actress Gwyneth Paltrow.  the main spokesmodel for Estée Lauder was supermodel Hilary Rhoda. In 2010, the company added three more faces to the roster, Chinese model Liu Wen, Puerto Rican model Joan Smalls, and French model Constance Jablonski.

In 2015, Estée Lauder signed model Kendall Jenner to promote the brand.

In 2017, the company announced Violette Serrat as their Global Beauty Director.

Alvin Chereskin, the founder of AC&R, was the long-time creative partner of the company.

Operations and finances

Finances
For fiscal year 2016, the Estée Lauder Companies achieved net sales of $11.26 billion, a 4% increase compared with $10.78 billion in the prior year. Net earnings for the year were $1.11 billion, a 2% increase compared with $1.09 billion last year, and diluted net earnings per common share rose 5% to $2.96, compared with $2.82 reported in the prior year. As of 2018, Estée Lauder Companies ranked 258 on the Fortune 500 list of the largest United States corporations by revenue.

Executive management
Leonard A. Lauder is chairman emeritus. William P. Lauder is executive chairman. Fabrizio Freda is president and chief executive officer.

Breast Cancer Awareness Campaign (BCA)
In October 1992, the BCA campaign was launched by Evelyn Lauder (Estée's daughter in law) who co-created the "Pink Ribbon" with SELF magazine as a symbol of breast health. Since then, millions of people globally have heard the message about the importance of breast health and early detection can save lives.
The Estée Lauder Companies’ annual Breast Cancer Awareness campaign involves all of the 19 brands that make up the Estée Lauder Companies. They collectively represent The Breast Cancer Research Foundation’s first and largest corporate supporter.

Since 1992, The Estée Lauder Companies’ Breast Cancer Campaign has raised more than $89 Million globally for lifesaving research, education, and medical services.

Environmental Activism 
In November 2022, Estée Lauder Companies pledged £100,000 ($115,453) to investigate water quality in Windermere, the largest lake in England. The company has also pledged £500,000 ($577,222) over the next five years that will be used to fund the pioneering nature restoration projects that will be carried out across multiple UK National Parks.

Brands
The Estée Lauder Companies brands include:

Cosmetics
 AERIN Beauty
 Bobbi Brown
 Clinique
 DECIEM by Brandon Truaxe
 Dr. Jart+
 Estée Lauder
 GLAMGLOW
 La Mer
 Lab Series
 MAC Cosmetics
 Origins
 Darphin Paris
 Smashbox
 Too Faced
 Tom Ford Beauty
Fragrance
 Aramis
 Kilian Paris
 Editions de Parfums Frédéric Malle
 Jo Malone London
 Lauder (Fragrances)
 Le Labo

Haircare
 Aveda
 Bumble and bumble

Controversies

SOPA
Estée Lauder Companies appeared on lists of major companies supporting SOPA, the controversial, but unsuccessful, Congressional anti-piracy bill that was considered overreaching by critics.

Child labor
In 2001, it was reported that children were discovered working in a factory in Cambridge, New York, making products for Origins, one of Estee Lauder's natural products brands. The contracted company was Common Sense Natural Soap & Bodycare, owned by a group led by cult leader Yoneq Gene Spriggs. Estee Lauder said it immediately moved to terminate the contract with the manufacturer it had been in business with for 5 years, stating it was totally unaware prior to the initial inspection.

Animal testing
The Estée Lauder Companies perform non-animal and human volunteer testing to assess product safety and efficacy. The Estée Lauder Companies product goes through animal testing where required by law by its country government. The Chinese government requires testing on animals for many cosmetic products. This causes controversy for smaller brands that are "cruelty free" but were acquired by Estée Lauder.

Boycott and anti-boycott

Since at least February 2001, Estée Lauder and its brands have been the target of a boycott campaign led by pro-Palestine activists who have targeted the corporation because of the pro-Israel activities of Ronald Lauder. In June 2003, the San Francisco-based Queers Undermining Israeli Terrorism (QUIT) took up the boycott with their "Estée Slaughter" campaign. The boycott has generated an anti-boycott campaign by supporters of Israel.

References

External links 

 Estée Lauder Companies Inc. website
 

 
Cosmetics companies of the United States
Companies based in Manhattan
History of cosmetics
Perfume houses
American companies established in 1946
Manufacturing companies established in 1946
1946 establishments in New York City
Companies listed on the New York Stock Exchange
1995 initial public offerings
Family-owned companies of the United States